Last Shower is a collaborative extended play (EP) by Canadian singer songwriter Tim Chaisson and Australian singer songwriter Diesel. A music video for the track "Last Shower" was released on 10 October 2013.
Chaisson and Diesel toured the EP throughout Australia in October and November 2013.

Reviews
Josh Dixon of Renowned for Sound gave the EP 4 stars out of 5 saying "The first thing you’ll notice with "Last Shower"... is that it combines the best elements of Chaisson’s voice and Diesel’s musicality to make for a unique collaboration.  The song has a western tinge to it, but is firmly rooted in acoustic rock stylings. It’s easy to listen to, and catchy enough that you’ll want to listen to it again." adding "It’s true that the music here could be deemed as generic, but the individual talents of the two singers are on display and make up for any shortcomings. Chaisson and Diesel both have impressive voices, and the harmonies on Last Shower make this perfectly known."

Track listing
 Digital download/ Compact Disc
"Last Shower" (3:38)
"Tip of My Tongue" (4:28)
"Speak Easier" (3:28)
"Wildflowers" (3:05)

Release history

References

2013 EPs
EPs by Australian artists
Diesel (musician) albums
Songs written by Diesel (musician)